Ipstones is a village and civil parish in the north of the English county of Staffordshire.

Ipstones is part of the Staffordshire Moorlands district; within the boundaries of the civil parish are the hamlets Foxt, Consall Forge and Bottomhouse.

Ipstones  is not mentioned in the Domesday book and dates from around the 12th century.  The majority of the houses and farms, barring modern development, are built from local sandstone. Two sections of the village are designated as Conservation Areas with several listed structures contained within them.

Ipstones was served by a railway station opened by the North Staffordshire Railway on 15 June 1905, on its line between Leekbrook Junction and Waterhouses. The station was closed to passengers on 30 September 1935. The buildings have been demolished but heritage trains of the Churnet Valley Railway now use the line again and there have been proposals to restore mineral trains to Caldon Low.

Ipstones has three pubs, a butcher's, a corner shop, an agricultural supplies store, a church and a primary school.

See also
Listed buildings in Ipstones

References

External links 

BBC article   
GENUKI(tm) page   
Church Website
Ipstones Agricultural Show website 
   
   

Villages in Staffordshire
Towns and villages of the Peak District
Staffordshire Moorlands